Atonement is a 1919 American silent drama film directed by William Humphrey and starring Grace Davison, Conway Tearle and Huntley Gordon.

Cast
 Grace Davison as Laura Hamilton
 Conway Tearle as Theodore Proctor
 Huntley Gordon as Vincent Carlton
 Sally Crute as Sarah Hamilton
 Tony Merlo as James Proctor 
 Gretchen Hartman as Marcia
 Jean Del Val as Tony
 Arthur Donaldson as Anselmo

References

Bibliography
 Goble, Alan. The Complete Index to Literary Sources in Film. Walter de Gruyter, 1999.

External links
 

1919 films
1919 drama films
1910s English-language films
American silent feature films
Silent American drama films
American black-and-white films
Films directed by William J. Humphrey
1910s American films